Qushjanabad (also Romanized as Qūshjānābād; also known as Qūshchālābād) is a village in Gorganbuy Rural District, in the Central District of Aqqala County, Golestan Province, Iran. At the 2006 census, its population was 1,019, in 218 families.

References

External link
 Qushjanabad, Iran Page on Fallingrain

Populated places in Aqqala County